Vader is the unofficial name given to a dark crater on Pluto's largest moon Charon. The crater was discovered by NASA's New Horizons space probe on its way by Pluto. It was named after Darth Vader from the Star Wars media franchise.

See also
 List of geological features on Charon

References

New Horizons
Darth Vader
Impact craters on Charon